Roepkiella artushka is a moth in the family Cossidae. It was described by Yakovlev in 2006. It is found in southern Thailand and Vietnam.

The length of the forewings is about 11 mm. The forewings are white, with a pattern of wavy streaks. The hindwings are white, with a weak reticulate pattern at the anal angle.

Etymology
The species name is derived from Artushka, the diminishing form of Arthur, the name of the son of the author.

References

Natural History Museum Lepidoptera generic names catalog

Cossinae
Moths described in 2006